KeyKit is a graphical environment and programming language for MIDI synthesis and algorithmic composition.  It was originally developed by Tim Thompson and released by AT&T.

Overview 
Tim Thompson is a software engineer and the originator of various software titles, including Keykit and Stevie (predecessor of the now widely distributed and popular text editor Vim). Keykit (originally named "Keynote") was developed by Thompson in his spare time while he worked for AT&T, though it was not related to his actual job there.  Keynote was originally released through the AT&T Toolchest, and
in 1995 was released as KeyKit with a license making it freely available for non-commercial use.

Keykit is noteworthy for its versatility and expressiveness. Complex algorithmic arrangements can be produced with as much detail and sophistication as required, and the software works on multiple platforms and operating systems. It is not dependent on peripherals or sound cards from a specific vendor. These are unique advantages over similar "music workstation" products with the same or similar functionality for algorithmic composition and computer generated music.

Language features 
 variables, functions, classes,  and dynamic typing
 supports object-oriented programming
 always-active MIDI recording
 multi-tasking environment
 library functions and classes (both built-in and user-definable)
 multi-platform multi-os and not dependent on specific peripherals

GUI features 
Features:
 GUI-based multi-track sequencer
 pop-up context menus
 built-in and user-definable "tools"

Limitations 
 interoperability: no support for COM/OLE, Jack, VST, ReWire
 no support for audio processing (MIDI only)

See also 
 Algorithmic composition
 List of MIDI editors and sequencers
 List of music software

External links 
 Keykit Download
 Tim Thompson software
 Tune Toys: interactive web-based algorithmic composition (based on KeyKit engine)
 Video demo of keykit from 1994
 Article about KeyKit from Linux Journal, March 2005

Audio programming languages
Dynamically typed programming languages
Object-oriented programming languages